Li Zheng may refer to:

 Li Zheng (diver) (born 2000), Chinese diver
 Li Zheng (educator) (1895–1975), Chinese educator and politician
 Li Zheng (weightlifter) (born 1986), Chinese weightlifter